Dragutin Šahović (1940 in Kraljevo – 2005 in Belgrade) was a chess Grandmaster. With is highest Elo being 2520.

He tied for first place in the 1977 Lone Pine International tournament.

References

External links

1940 births
2005 deaths
Chess grandmasters
Serbian chess players
20th-century chess players